Sass or Saß is a surname which may refer to:

 A. J. Sass, American author
 Anatoliy Sass (born 1935), Russian Olympic rower
 Dawn Marie Sass (born 1959), American politician who was elected Treasurer of Wisconsin in 2006
 Else Kai Sass (1912–1987), Danish art historian
 Evelyn Handler (1933–2011), née Sass, first American woman to be named president of a publicly supported land grant university
 Hans-Martin Sass (born 1935), German bioethicist and Professor of Philosophy 
 Henry Sass (1788–1844), English artist and teacher of painting who founded an important art school in London
 Jonathan Sass (born 1961), American jazz tuba player and composer
 Katrin Sass (born 1956), German actress, best known for playing Christiane Kerner in the film Goodbye Lenin
 Louis Sass (born? still living) Professor of Clinical Psychology
 Katrina Von Sass (born 1972), Canadian Olympic volleyball player
 Paul Sass, English mixed martial arts fighter
 Richard Sass (1774–1849), English landscape painter, etcher, and drawing master to royalty
 Sylvia Sass (born 1951), Hungarian operatic soprano
 Theodor von Sass (1881–1958), a German Lutheran pastor and community leader